The Leader of the Seanad (referred to within the Seanad as Leader of the House ) is a member of Seanad Éireann appointed by the Taoiseach to direct government business.  Since December 2022, the incumbent is Lisa Chambers of Fianna Fáil. The Deputy leader of the Seanad is Regina Doherty of Fine Gael.

Role
The Leader plays a similar role in the Seanad's procedure to that played by the Taoiseach in Dáil Éireann: 
 moving the day's order of business
 may present a government bill without prior notice
 ex-officio member of the Committee on Procedure and Privileges
 may move a vote of sympathy

History
In the old Seanad of the Irish Free State, there was no separate position of Leader. The order of business was controlled by the Cathaoirleach (chair). This was a symptom of the Seanad's independence from the Executive Council (government), which annoyed Éamon de Valera as President of the Executive Council. De Valera's Fianna Fáil government secured the abolition of the Seanad in 1936.

De Valera's 1937 Constitution created a new Seanad with less independence from the Dáil. The standing orders of the new Seanad provided for the role of Leader to control the flow of business from the government. A 2004 Seanad report into reforming its own functions recommended that the Leader be allowed to attend cabinet meetings, with a rank of minister or minister of state. Maurice Manning noted in 2010 that recent Leaders had more influence with the government, leading to increased input by the Seanad into legislation.

List

References

Seanad Éireann
Lists of members of Seanad Éireann